The 2022 Shymkent Challenger II was a professional tennis tournament played on clay courts. It was the sixth edition of the tournament which was part of the 2022 ATP Challenger Tour. It took place in Shymkent, Kazakhstan between 16 and 21 May 2022.

Singles main-draw entrants

Seeds

 1 Rankings are as of 9 May 2022.

Other entrants
The following players received wildcards into the singles main draw:
  Saba Purtseladze
  Dostanbek Tashbulatov
  Beibit Zhukayev

The following players received entry into the singles main draw as alternates:
  Sebastian Fanselow
  Alibek Kachmazov

The following players received entry from the qualifying draw:
  Sergey Fomin
  Ivan Gakhov
  Arjun Kadhe
  Mukund Sasikumar
  Eric Vanshelboim
  Evan Zhu

Champions

Singles

 Sergey Fomin def.  Robin Haase 7–6(7–4), 6–3.

Doubles

 Sanjar Fayziev /  Markos Kalovelonis def.  Mikael Torpegaard /  Kaichi Uchida 6–7(3–7), 6–4, [10–4].

References

2022 ATP Challenger Tour
2022
2022 in Kazakhstani sport
May 2022 sports events in Asia